The year 1915 in radio involved some significant events.

Events
 29 September – A transcontinental radio telephone message is transmitted from the United States Navy radio station at Arlington, Virginia, to the naval radio station at Mare Island, California; then a few hours later relayed to Honolulu.

Births
 3 January – Frank Shozo Baba, born フランク 正三 馬場, Japanese-born radio broadcaster (died 2008)
 25 January – Ewan MacColl, born James Miller, British folk singer-songwriter, actor and labour activist, co-creator of the radio ballad (died 1989)

References

 
Radio by year